The 2011–12 Seton Hall Pirates men's basketball team represented Seton Hall University during the 2011–12 NCAA Division I men's basketball season. The Pirates, led by head coach Kevin Willard, played its home games in Newark, New Jersey at the Prudential Center and are members of the Big East Conference. They finished the season 21–13, 8–10 in Big East play to finish in a tie for eighth place. They lost in the second round of the Big East Basketball tournament to Louisville. They were invited to the 2012 National Invitation Tournament, where they hosted two home games played at Walsh Gymnasium and lost in the second round to Massachusetts.

Roster

Schedule and results

|-
!colspan=9 style="background:#0000FF; color:#D3D3D3;"| Regular season Non–Conference

|-
!colspan=9 style="background:#0000FF; color:#D3D3D3;"| Big East Regular Season

|-
!colspan=12 style="text-align: center; background:#0000FF"|2012 Big East tournament 
   
 
|-
!colspan=12 style="text-align: center; background:#0000FF"|2012 NIT

See also
2011–12 Big East Conference men's basketball season

Notes

Seton Hall
Seton Hall Pirates men's basketball seasons
Seton Hall
Seton Hall
Seton Hall